Marshall Terrill (born December 17, 1963, in Texarkana, Texas) is an American author and journalist.  He is noted for biographies on Steve McQueen, Elvis Presley, Johnny Cash, Billy Graham and Pete Maravich.

Early years: 1963-1982
Terrill is one of four children of Mike and Carolyn Terrill.  An Air Force brat, he lived in Big Spring and Waco, Texas; Sacramento, California and Montgomery, Alabama.  He mainly grew up in Northern Virginia and San Antonio, Texas.  Terrill attended Hayfield Elementary School in Alexandria, Virginia, Madison High School in San Antonio, and graduated from Robinson High School in Fairfax, Virginia.

Phoenix, Arizona: 1982-1989
After high school Terrill moved to Phoenix, Arizona.  While studying business he worked for financier Charles Keating beginning in 1984. Five years later Keating's company, Lincoln Savings & Loan, was the target of a federal investigation.  Keating was sent sentenced to jail and Terrill was suddenly unemployed.  At age 26, he moved back into his parents’ home in Northern Virginia and began his second career, as a biographer. His first subject: actor Steve McQueen.

Steve McQueen Project: 1989 to 1993
With the Library of Congress at his disposal, Terrill spent the next three-and-a-half years researching the life of McQueen.  In December 1993, the 564-page Steve McQueen: Portrait of an American Rebel, was released.  The book, noted for its exhaustive research, was featured in numerous publications including USA Today, New York Post, Playboy, Entertainment Weekly, The Washington Post, Variety, Cosmopolitan, Chicago Tribune, San Francisco Chronicle, and the Arizona Republic. Portrait of an American Rebel became a best-seller and has gone into four printings.

More biographies: 1994-2002
Terrill moved back to Phoenix in 1994 and followed his biography on McQueen with collaborations with actor Edd "Kookie" Byrnes and actress Barbara Leigh, boxers Aaron Pryor, Ken Norton, and Earnie Shavers (co-authored with Mike Fitzgerald), and basketball legend David Thompson (co-authored by Sean Stormes).

In 1999, Terrill was hired by the East Valley Tribune as a daily reporter.

He and his wife Zoe also co-authored Sergeant Presley in 2002 with Rex and Elisabeth Mansfield.

That same year he took a job with the Chandler Connection, a weekly publication in Chandler, Arizona, which morphed into the Ocotillo Tribune in August 2007.

Terrill was hired in 2008 by Arizona State University's Public Affairs Division promoting the university's campus in downtown Phoenix.

2002 to present

2005 saw the 25th anniversary of Steve McQueen's death and with it came another re-examination of his life and work.  London-based Plexus publishing updated Steve McQueen: Portrait of an American Rebel, with a new beginning and end chapter. That same year, Terrill met McQueen's last wife and widow, Barbara, and the two began working on a photo book.

In October 2006, Terrill released Maravich, co-authored by Wayne Federman, an exhaustively researched biography on the basketball great, who died on January 5, 1988, from a heart defect.  The book took seven years to research and write and was done with the cooperation of Jackie Maravich, the athlete's widow. Focus on the Family/Tyndale Publishing released the paperback version of the book in September 2008 called Pete Maravich: The Authorized Biography of Pistol Pete Maravich.

Terrill also released Steve McQueen: The Last Mile, which is a 250-page photo book containing more than 150 photos of the actor taken by Barbara McQueen.

Elvis: Still Taking Care of Business was released in May 2007.  Terrill co-authored with Sonny West, who was Presley's friend and bodyguard for 16 years. West and Terrill spent four years on the manuscript. The book was released in tradeback in August 2008.

In 2009 Terrill co-wrote Palm Springs á la Carte: The Colorful World of the Caviar Crowd at Their Favorite Desert Hideaway with businessman Mel Haber, who is the longtime owner of the Ingleside Inn and Melvyn's restaurant in Palm Springs, California.

Terrill will oversee the release of two Steve McQueen books in 2010: "Steve McQueen: A Tribute to the King of Cool," (Dalton Watson Fine Books) is a 384-page photo/passage book that was published on March 24, 2010, what would have been McQueen's 80th birthday. "Steve McQueen: The Life and Legacy of a Hollywood Icon," (Triumph Books) is a brand new 600-page plus bio on the actor. It was released in November 2010 to commemorate the 30th anniversary of McQueen's death.

In April 2011, the Hollywood Reporter announced that two-time Oscar nominee Jeremy Renner will produce and star in an upcoming McQueen biopic based on Steve McQueen: The Life and Legacy of a Hollywood Icon.

In 2011 Terrill wrote Downtown Phoenix Campus Arizona State University: The First 5 Years. It tells the story of how ASU President Michael Crow and former City of Phoenix Mayor Phil Gordon joined forces to create the Downtown Phoenix campus in less than three years time. The book is available as a free download by visiting http://www.asu.edu/firstfive/ebook.pdf

The Arizona Republic named Terrill 'Biographer of the Year' in its annual best of issue in March 2012.

2014 saw the publication of two books: "Guitar With Wings" (Dalton Watson Fine Books), a photo memoir with Grammy Artist Laurence Juber, former guitarist for Paul McCartney's Wings (1978-1981) and "Zora Folley: The Distinguished Life and Mysterious Death of a Gentleman Boxer," a 93-page ebook.

Terrill's 19th book "Rock and a Heart Place" with Ken Mansfield, is an anthology chronicling the spiritual lives of more than a dozen musicians from the rock era.

Continuing the rock and roll circuit, Terrill's 20th book was published by Triumph in 2016 as the co-author of "Still So Excited: My Life as a Pointer Sister" with Ruth Pointer.

In 2017, Terrill published two more books on "The King of Cool" - "Steve McQueen: Le Mans in the Rearview Mirror," a coffee-table book with property master Don Nunley on the 1971 racing picture and "Steve McQueen: The Salvation of an American Icon" with Pastor Greg Laurie, which examines McQueen's decision to become a born again Christian near the end of his life. The book also spawned a feature documentary called "Steve McQueen: American Icon" in which Terrill served as an executive producer. It was released nationwide on September 28, 2017.

Terrill and Laurie partnered again in 2019 for "Johnny Cash: The Redemption of an American Icon," continuing on with the series of examinations of pop culture artists who have become born again Christians. A feature documentary is also in the works for 2021.

The year 2020 marked the 40th anniversary of Steve McQueen's death, which Terrill commemorated with his seventh book on the global icon called "Steve McQueen: In His Own words." The 504-page photo book contained more than 500 photo and approximately 450 quotations from "The King of Cool." The book was widely reviewed, including Parade, Entertainment Weekly, The Daily Beast, Closer Weekly and Inside Hook.

In 2021, Terrill and Greg Laurie teamed up again for "Billy Graham: The Man I Knew," an intimate look at the world's best-known evangelist who was loved and known by millions. Laurie was one of those fortunate few blessed with an insider’s view of Billy Graham’s world for more than two decades. Terrill kept busy in 2021 with a second release called "Jesus Music: The Visual Story of Redemption as Told By Those Who Lived It", a history of Contemporary Christian Music. It features exclusive interviews with Amy Grant, Michael W. Smith, Kirk Franklin, TobyMac, Michael Tait, Chuck Girard and Tommy Coomes.

Early in 2022, Terrill announced the formation of True Tales of the Southwest LLC, a production company dedicated to the creation of feature documentary films. The first release is set for 2024.

Bibliography
Steve McQueen: Portrait of an American Rebel, (1993) Donald I. Fine
Edd Byrnes: 'Kookie' No More, (1996) Barricade Books
Flight of the Hawk: The Aaron Pryor Story, (1996) Book World
Ken Norton: Going the Distance (2000) (with Mike Fitzgerald) Sports Publishing Inc.
Earnie Shavers: Welcome to the Big Time (2002) (with Mike Fitzgerald) Sports Publishing Inc.
The King, McQueen and the Love Machine: My Secret Hollywood Life with Elvis Presley, Steve McQueen and the Smiling Cobra, (2002) Xlibris (an autobiography by Barbara Leigh) 
Sergeant Presley (2002) (with Rex and Elisabeth Mansfield and Zoe Terrill) ECW Press
David Thompson: Skywalker, (2003) (with Sean Stormes) Sports Publishing Inc.
Maravich (2006) (with Wayne Federman) Sport Classic Books
Steve McQueen: The Last Mile, (2006) Dalton Watson Fine Books
Elvis: Still Taking Care of Business (2007) Triumph/Random House

Steve McQueen: A Tribute to the King of Cool (2010) Dalton Watson Fine Books
Steve McQueen: The Life and Legacy of a Hollywood Icon (2010) Triumph Books
Downtown Phoenix Campus Arizona State University: The First 5 Years (2011) ASU
From Normal School to New American University: A History of the Arizona State University Foundation (2013) (with Dean Smith) ASU
Guitar With Wings (2014) Dalton Watson Fine Books
Zora Folley: The Distinguished Life and Mysterious Death of a Gentleman Boxer (2014) MT Productions
Rock and a Heart Place (with Ken Mansfield) (2015) BroadStreet Publishing
Still So Excited: My Life as a Pointer Sister (with Ruth Pointer) (2016) Triumph Books
Steve McQueen: Le Mans in the Rearview Mirror (with Don Nunley) (2017) Dalton Watson Fine Books
Steve McQueen: The Salvation of an American Icon (with Greg Laurie) (2017) American Icon Press
Johnny Cash: The Redemption of an American Icon (with Greg Laurie) (2019) Salem Books 
Steve McQueen: In His Own Words (2020) Dalton Watson Fine Books
Billy Graham: The Man I Knew (2021) (with Greg Laurie) Salem Books
Jesus Music: The Visual Story of Redemption as Told By Those Who Lived It (2022) K-LOVE Books
Lennon, Dylan, Alice & Jesus: The Spiritual Biography of Rock 'n' Roll (with Greg Laurie) (2022) Salem Books

References

1963 births
Living people
People from Texarkana, Texas
American biographers
American male non-fiction writers
Writers from Phoenix, Arizona
People from Chandler, Arizona
People from Tempe, Arizona
20th-century American non-fiction writers
21st-century American non-fiction writers
20th-century American male writers
21st-century American male writers